Yaşar Alpaslan (23 March 1914 – 1995) was a Turkish footballer. He competed in the men's tournament at the 1936 Summer Olympics.

References

External links
 

1914 births
1995 deaths
Turkish footballers
Turkey international footballers
Olympic footballers of Turkey
Footballers at the 1936 Summer Olympics
Place of birth missing
Association football defenders